The White Countess is a 1954 play by J.B. Priestley and his wife Jacquetta Hawkes.

It was first staged at the Gaiety Theatre in Dublin before transferring to London's West End. However, it ran for only five performances at the Saville Theatre before closing. The production was savaged by most critics, although the reviewer of the New Statesman defended it. The cast included Maurice Teynac and Viveca Lindfors, making her West End debut.

References

Bibliography
 Wearing, J.P. The London Stage 1950-1959: A Calendar of Productions, Performers, and Personnel.  Rowman & Littlefield, 2014.

1954 plays
Plays by J. B. Priestley
West End plays